Ruslan Viktorovich Gumar (born 18 November 1973) is a Kazakhstani footballer. His first club was FC Ekibastuzets.

External links

Kazakhstani footballers
Living people
1973 births
FC Irtysh Pavlodar players
Association football defenders
FC Lokomotiv Nizhny Novgorod players
Kazakhstan international footballers